{{DISPLAYTITLE:C11H15NO4}}
The molecular formula C11H15NO4 (molar mass: 225.24 g/mol) may refer to:

 Etilevodopa, a dopaminergic agent
 Morpholine salicylate, a nonsteroidal anti-inflammatory drug

Molecular formulas